The 1987 IAAF Grand Prix Final was the third edition of the season-ending competition for the IAAF Grand Prix track and field circuit, organised by the International Association of Athletics Federations. It was held on 11 September at the King Baudouin Stadium in Brussels, Belgium. Tonie Campbell (110 metres hurdles) and Merlene Ottey (100 metres) were the overall points winners of the tournament.

Medal summary

Men

Women

Points leaders

Men

Women

References
IAAF Grand Prix Final. GBR Athletics. Retrieved on 2015-01-17.

External links
IAAF Grand Prix Final archive from IAAF

Grand Prix Final
Grand Prix Final
IAAF Grand Prix Final
1980s in Brussels
International athletics competitions hosted by Belgium
Sports competitions in Brussels